Cosford Rural District was a rural district in the county of West Suffolk, England. It was created in 1894 out of the earlier Cosford rural sanitary district, except for Hadleigh parish which was made a separate urban district. Only minor adjustments were made to its boundary in the reorganisation of 1935. It was named after the historic hundred of Cosford, although the rural district covered a significantly larger area that included most of Cosford hundred (with the notable exception of Hadleigh) and part of the neighbouring hundred of Babergh.

Since 1 April 1974 it has formed part of the local government district of Babergh.

Parishes
Cosford RD contained the parishes of

Statistics

References

History of Suffolk
Districts of England created by the Local Government Act 1894
Districts of England abolished by the Local Government Act 1972
Rural districts of England